John Alfred Webb (January 13, 1916 – February 12, 2008) was a mystery writer who often featured the detective team of Sammy Golden and Father Joseph Shanley. He died in Coronado, California.

Books

as Jack Webb 
 Sammy Golden & Joseph Shanley 
The Big Sin (Rinehart & Company, hardback, 1952)
The Naked Angel aka Such Women Are Dangerous (Rinehart, hardback, 1953)
The Damned Lovely (Rinehart, hardback, 1954)
The Broken Doll (Rinehart, hardback, 1955)
The Bad Blonde (Rinehart, hardback, 1956)
The Brass Halo (Rinehart, hardback, 1957)
The Deadly Sex (Rinehart, hardback, 1959)
The Delicate Darling (Rinehart, hardback, 1959)
The Gilded Witch (Regency Books, paperback original, 1963)

 Standalones 
One for My Dame (Holt, Rinehart & Winston, hardback, 1961)
Make My Bed Soon (Holt, Rinehart & Winston, hardback, 1963)

pseudonym John Farr 
Don't Feed the Animals (Abelard-Schuman, hardback, 1955) reissued as Naked Fear and Zoo Murders
She Shark (Ace Books, paperback, 1956) reissued in Australia as Murder Ship (Phantom Books, paperback, 1958)
The Lady and the Snake (Ace Books, paperback, 1957)
The Deadly Combo (Ace Books, paperback, 1958) double book edition together with J. Harvey Bond's Murder isn't Funny

External links 
http://www.fantasticfiction.co.uk/f/john-farr/
http://www.fantasticfiction.co.uk/w/jack-webb/

the bad blond was published by Rinehart in 1956 not in 1955. I have the first edition. joe

American mystery writers
1916 births
2008 deaths
American male novelists
20th-century American novelists
20th-century American male writers